"Ich hab dich" (English: I Got You) is a song by German recording artist Nadja Benaissa. It was written by Benaissa and Tino Oac for her debut solo album Schritt für Schritt (2006), while production was helmed by Oac. A slightly remixed version of the song, produced by Paul NZA, was released as the album's second single and reached the top forty of the German Singles Chart, becoming the album's highest-charting single. "Ich hab dich" served as the Hessian entry at the Bundesvision Song Contest 2006, where it eventually placed fourth.

Track listings

Credits and personnel

 Nadja Benaissa – lead vocals, lyrics, music
 Ulf Hattwig – mastering
 Alex Nies – drums, percussion

 Tini Oac – mixing, production, recording
 Woolf Schönecker – guitar
 Florian Sitzmann – mixing, organ

Charts

References

2006 songs